Dmitri Vladimirovich Sidorenko (born 23 March 1973) is a former Russian football player.

References

1973 births
Living people
Russian footballers
FC Kuban Krasnodar players
Russian Premier League players
Place of birth missing (living people)
FC Yugra Nizhnevartovsk players
Association football defenders
FC Tyumen players